Yoshiyasu is a masculine Japanese given name.

Possible writings
Yoshiyasu can be written using many different combinations of kanji characters. Here are some examples: 

義康, "justice, healthy"
義安, "justice, peaceful"
義靖, "justice, peaceful"
義泰, "justice, peaceful"
義保, "justice, preserve"
吉康, "good luck, healthy"
吉安, "good luck, peaceful"
吉靖, "good luck, peaceful"
吉泰, "good luck, peaceful"
吉保, "good luck, preserve"
善康, "virtuous, healthy"
善安, "virtuous, peaceful"
善靖, "virtuous, peaceful"
善泰, "virtuous, peaceful"
善保, "virtuous, preserve"
芳康, "virtuous, healthy"
芳安, "virtuous/fragrant, peaceful"
芳靖, "virtuous/fragrant, peaceful"
芳泰, "virtuous/fragrant, peaceful"
芳保, "virtuous/fragrant, preserve"
好孚, "good/like something, sincere"
慶保, "congratulate, preserve"

The name can also be written in hiragana よしやす or katakana ヨシヤス.

Notable people with the name
, Japanese speed skater
Yoshiyasu Kuno (久納 好孚, 1921–1944), the first Japanese pilot in World War II to fly a kamikaze mission
, Japanese daimyō
, Japanese samurai
, Japanese photographer
, Japanese samurai and daimyō

Japanese masculine given names